Resinogalea is a single-species fungus genus in the family Bruceomycetaceae. Both the genus and its species Resinogalea humboldtensis were described as new to science in 2016 by Jouko Rikkinen and Alexander Schmidt. The fungus, found in New Caledonia, grows on the semi-hardened resin exuded by the endemic tree species Araucaria humboldtensis.

References

Lecanorales
Monotypic Lecanorales genera
Taxa described in 2016